The 1988 St. Louis Cardinals season was the team's 107th season in St. Louis, Missouri and its 97th season in the National League. The Cardinals went 76-86 during the season and finished 5th in the National League East division.

Offseason
 October 7, 1987: Doug DeCinces was released by the Cardinals.
 February 9, 1988: Lance Johnson, Ricky Horton and cash were traded by the Cardinals to the Chicago White Sox for José DeLeón.

Regular season
Shortstop Ozzie Smith won a Gold Glove this year.

Opening Day starters

Season standings

Record vs. opponents

Notable transactions
 April 22, 1988: Tom Herr was traded by the Cardinals to the Minnesota Twins for Tom Brunansky.
 June 1, 1988: Mark Clark was drafted by the Cardinals in the 9th round of the 1988 Major League Baseball draft. Player signed June 3, 1988.
 August 31, 1988: Bob Forsch was traded by the Cardinals to the Houston Astros for Denny Walling.

Roster

Player stats

Batting

Starters by position
Note: Pos = Position; G = Games played; AB = At bats; H = Hits; Avg. = Batting average; HR = Home runs; RBI = Runs batted in

Other batters
Note: G = Games played; AB = At bats; H = Hits; Avg. = Batting average; HR = Home runs; RBI = Runs batted in

Pitching

Starting pitchers
Note: G = Games pitched; IP = Innings pitched; W = Wins; L = Losses; ERA = Earned run average; SO = Strikeouts

Other pitchers
Note: G = Games pitched; IP = Innings pitched; W = Wins; L = Losses; ERA = Earned run average; SO = Strikeouts

Relief pitchers
Note: G = Games pitched; W = Wins; L = Losses; SV = Saves; ERA = Earned run average; SO = Strikeouts

Awards and honors
 Ozzie Smith, Shortstop, National League Gold Glove

League leaders 
 Vince Coleman, National League Stolen Base Leader, 81 
 Joe Magrane, NL ERA leader, 2.18.

Farm system

References

External links
1988 St. Louis Cardinals at Baseball Reference
1988 St. Louis Cardinals team page at www.baseball-almanac.com

St. Louis Cardinals seasons
Saint Louis Cardinals season
St Louis